Makhenkesi Arnold Stofile (27 December 1944 – 15 August 2016) was a South African politician. He was Minister of Sport and Recreation from 2004 to 2010. At the time of his death he was serving as Ambassador to Germany.

Stofile was born in Adelaide in the Eastern Cape. He studied towards a master's degree in Theology at the University of Fort Hare, and he also obtained a Master of Arts from Princeton University in 1983.

Stofile joined the African National Congress (ANC) in 1963. He was charged with harbouring of terrorists by the Ciskei government and served a three-year jail sentence.

Stofile was also an ordained minister of the Uniting Presbyterian Church in Southern Africa

Stofile was not only a politician and church man, but also a great sportsman. He played scrum-half and wing for the Border Rugby team, and was a loud voice in the campaign towards non-racial sports.

In 1984 he travelled to New Zealand where he led a successful campaign against the planned All Blacks' tour of South Africa.

After the 1994 democratic elections, Stofile was the ANC's chief whip in parliament. He held that position until his appointment as Premier of the Eastern Cape in 1997.

In 2009, he threatened third world war over gender test results of an athlete, which found that runner Caster Semenya was a hermaphrodite, with internal testes.

He died at his home in Alice, Eastern Cape, on 15 August 2016 at the age of 71.

References

1944 births
2016 deaths
People from Raymond Mhlaba Local Municipality
Xhosa people
South African Calvinist and Reformed Christians
African National Congress politicians
South African Ministers for Sport and Recreation
Members of the National Assembly of South Africa
Premiers of the Eastern Cape
Ambassadors of South Africa to Germany
University of Fort Hare alumni
Princeton University alumni